SeaStar or Sea Star may refer to:
Sea Star Festival, summer music festival in Umag, Croatia
Starfish, an echinoderm belonging to the class Asteroidea
AAC SeaStar, a two-seat biplane from Canada
Dornier Seawings Seastar, an amphibious aircraft with two engines in a push-pull configuration
MV Sea Star, a supertanker
SeaStar Aircraft SeaStar, a two-seat monoplane from Hungary
Sea Star Awards, Argentine entertainment awards
SeaStar, or OrbView-2, the satellite hosting the SeaWiFS instrument
SeaStar, the communications processors in Cray XT3 and XT4 supercomputers
Lockheed T2V SeaStar